Corey McGriff (August 11, 1978 – March 27, 2011), better known as DJ Megatron, was a DJ, record producer, rapper, radio and television personality.

Career
McGriff broadcast hip hop, R&B and urban music through various radio stations in a number of cities in the United States including initially as an intern at New York's WRKS-FM (also known as Kiss FM) as an on-air sidekick of popular personality Fatman Scoop, then for two years at Boston's WBOT-FM (Hot 97.7) and for two-and-one-half years at Philadelphia's WPHI-FM (The Beat).

He was also part of the Black Entertainment Television (BET) television station's "106 & Park" countdown show with his popular segment entitled "What's Good". He was also the host of BET's "On Blast" Internet show.

McGriff was a promoter of local artists from Staten Island. He also appeared in a number of films, including most notably, State Property 2, Blood of a Champion and Killa Season.

Personal life
McGriff was engaged to fiancée Shyleen and he had three children.

Death
On March 27, 2011, McGriff was found dead from a gunshot wound to the chest near his home in Staten Island, New York. Two New York City men, William Williams, 21, and Richard Cromwell, 20, were arrested on April 6, 2011 on charges of murder, robbery and criminal weapon possession in relation to his death. On Tuesday, January 8, 2013 William Williams entered a guilty plead to first-degree manslaughter. He was sentenced to 21 years in prison.

References

External links
DJ Megatron on Myspace

1979 births
2011 deaths
African-American musicians
American DJs
American radio personalities
American television personalities
Deaths by firearm in Staten Island
Murdered African-American people
American murder victims
People murdered in New York City
Male murder victims
2011 murders in the United States
20th-century African-American people
21st-century African-American people